Jan Veselý (17 June 1923 – 10 February 2003) was a Czech cyclist. He won the Peace Race individually in 1949 and with the Czechoslovak team in 1950 and 1951. He finished second individually in 1952 and 1955, and won no fewer than sixteen stages. Thus he became one of the most famous cyclists in the Eastern Bloc, and an iconic figure in his homeland.

Cycling was extremely popular in post-war Europe, and the Peace Race was bigger even than the Tour de France. Veselý's humility, allied to his sporting prowess, made him a genuine national hero. His duels with the great East German rider Gustav-Adolf ("Täve") Schur were amongst the highlights of the sporting year, his popularity comparable to that of the great runner Emil Zátopek in Czechoslovakia.

He competed in the individual and team road race events at the 1952 Summer Olympics. His brother Josef was also a competitive road cyclist and won a national title in 1943.

References

External links
 

1923 births
2003 deaths
Czechoslovak male cyclists
Olympic cyclists of Czechoslovakia
Cyclists at the 1952 Summer Olympics
Czech male cyclists
People from České Budějovice District
Sportspeople from the South Bohemian Region